Lucian Lincoln "Lin" Wood Jr. (born October 19, 1952) is an American attorney and conspiracy theorist.

Following his graduation from law school in 1977, Wood worked as a personal injury lawyer, focusing on medical malpractice litigation. He became known as a "celebrity lawyer" specializing in defamation lawsuits. Wood first drew media attention in relation to his representation of Richard Jewell, the security guard falsely accused in the Centennial Olympic Park bombing in Atlanta in 1996. Wood's representation of Jewell helped transform him from a personal injury lawyer to a nationally known defamation lawyer.

In addition to representing Jewell, Wood has represented the family of JonBenét Ramsey and former U.S. representative Gary Condit in defamation suits. He was also hired by Republican political candidate Herman Cain to respond to allegations of sexual harassment.

By 2020, Wood was frequently garnering attention through his promotion of conspiracy theories, both in his capacity as a lawyer and as a political commentator and social media personality. After Joe Biden won the presidential election, Wood promoted falsehoods and conspiracy theories on behalf of President Donald Trump, who he claimed actually won the election with 70% of the vote. Wood claimed that a secret cabal of international communists, Chinese intelligence, and Republican officials had contrived to steal the election from Trump. Sometimes in association with Trump's attorney, conspiracy theorist Sidney Powell, Wood litigated on the president's behalf in many failed lawsuits, which sought to prevent the certification of legally cast ballots in the presidential election.

In the latter part of 2020, Wood's social media activities attracted considerable attention. Wood called for the imprisonment of Georgia Governor Brian Kemp and Secretary of State Brad Raffensperger, based on the conspiracy theory that the two Republican officials worked with the Chinese to help rig the vote for Biden. Wood made allegations against Chief Justice John Roberts reflecting QAnon conspiracy theories. He suggested that Vice President Mike Pence would "face execution by firing squad" and called for the arrest of then-Senate Majority Leader Mitch McConnell, both for treason. Delaware Supreme Court Judge Craig A. Karsnitz revoked Wood's permission to appear pro hac vice before the Court, writing that there was "no doubt" that Wood's tweets were among the factors that incited the storming of the U.S. Capitol by a pro-Trump mob in January 2021.

In August 2021,  U.S. District Judge Linda Parker of the Eastern District of Michigan formally sanctioned Wood, Powell, and seven other pro-Trump lawyers for their suit seeking to overturn Trump's election loss. The court determined that the nine attorneys had participated in "a historic and profound abuse of the judicial process," namely filing a  baseless, frivolous lawsuit in order to undermine public confidence in the democratic process. The court ordered Wood and the other lawyers to pay costs to the State of Michigan and the City of Detroit for their expenses in defending against the lawsuit and referred them to their respective state disciplinary authorities for possible disbarment for conduct violating the rules of ethics for attorneys. Parker set the costs against the attorneys at $175,000, with almost $155,000 going to the city of Detroit and $22,000 to Michigan.

Early life and education
Wood was born in Raleigh, North Carolina and was raised in Macon, Georgia from the age of three. He stated that his family struggled financially, with frequent episodes of domestic abuse involving his parents. He has one sister, Diane Wood Stern, born February 1951, and a half-sister, Linda Martin, born in 1946. After a school dance, the then 16-year-old Wood returned home to find his father had beaten his mother to death. L. Lin Wood Sr. pleaded guilty to involuntary manslaughter, a charge reduced from first-degree murder. He served a little over two years in prison. Wood has stated that it was this experience that solidified his earlier decision to become a lawyer.

Wood lived with friends and graduated from Mark Smith High School in Macon, Georgia in 1970. He attended Mercer University, graduating cum laude in 1974, and Mercer University School of Law, graduating cum laude in 1977. He was admitted to the Georgia Bar. From 1977 to 1996, Wood litigated personal injury cases and medical malpractice cases in the State of Georgia.

Career
Lin Wood rose to prominence after representing Richard Jewell, who was falsely accused of perpetrating the 1996 Centennial Olympic Park bombing in Atlanta, and he subsequently represented clients in high-profile defamation cases.

Notable clients

Richard Jewell 
Wood's first libel and defamation client was Richard Jewell, the security guard accused in the Centennial Olympic Park bombing in Atlanta in 1996. Wood sued a number of media outlets, as well as Jewell's employer. Wood reached monetary settlements from Jewell's employer, CNN, and NBC, while Time published a clarification, but paid no settlement. In 2012, after fifteen years of litigation, the Georgia Supreme Court upheld trial court decisions ruling against Jewell in his libel suit against the Atlanta Journal-Constitution.

JonBenet Ramsey 
Jewell was quickly followed by other high-profile cases, including John and Patsy Ramsey, the parents of JonBenét Ramsey, whose 1996 murder is still unsolved. Wood represented John and Patsy Ramsey and their son Burke, pursuing defamation claims on their behalf against St. Martin's Press, Time Inc., The Fox News Channel, American Media, Inc., Star, The Globe, Court TV and The New York Post. The lawsuit against Star was settled.

John and Patsy Ramsey were also sued in two separate defamation lawsuits arising from the publication of their book, The Death of Innocence. The suit was brought by two individuals named in the book as having been investigated by Boulder police as suspects in JonBenét's murder. The Ramseys were defended in those lawsuits by Lin Wood and three other Atlanta attorneys, James C. Rawls, Eric P. Schroeder, and S. Derek Bauer. The lawsuits against the Ramseys were dismissed.

In 2016, Wood represented Burke Ramsey, older brother of murder victim JonBenet Ramsey, in a pair of related lawsuits stemming from the CBS network docuseries The Case of JonBenét Ramsey. The first suit was filed against Dr. Werner Spitz, a Michigan-based forensic pathologist, over his assertion in a promotional CBS Detroit radio interview that Burke killed his sister when she was a young child. The other suit was against CBS and other parties involved in the docuseries, where the same allegations were made. Both lawsuits were settled out of court.

Kyle Rittenhouse 
Wood joined the defense for Kyle Rittenhouse, a teenager who had killed two Kenosha, Wisconsin protesters and permanently disabled a third, and was initially being held on murder charges in Illinois, set in Wisconsin at $2 million. He was eventually found not guilty but Wood had helped raise the bail money and said he was owed another $700,000 for legal services, with the money to go to his "FightBack Foundation." Rittenhouse wanted the money for himself and sued for it. Wood's foundation was eventually awarded $925,000.

Other clients 
Wood represented former U.S. Congressman Gary Condit, and the alleged victim in the Kobe Bryant case.

In November 2011, Wood was hired by then-presidential candidate Herman Cain, in his efforts to fight off sexual harassment accusations.

Wood was a lead attorney in a whistleblower case against DaVita Healthcare. The suit was settled in 2015 for $450 million plus up to $45 million in fees.

Wood was the lead attorney in Nicholas Sandmann's defamation suits against a number of media companies, including CNN and The Washington Post. Sandmann, a student at Covington Catholic High School, was a party to the January 2019 Lincoln Memorial confrontation. In January 2020, Wood settled with CNN, and in July 2020, the suit was settled with The Washington Post.

In December 2019, Wood lost a multi-million defamation case for Vernon Unsworth against Elon Musk who had branded him a "pedo guy". The case was lost because the jury felt that Musk's tweet did not properly identify Unsworth, as he was not mentioned by name.

In 2020 and 2021, Wood represented U.S. representative for Georgia's 14th congressional district, Marjorie Taylor Greene. He also represented Mark and Patricia McCloskey, the couple who aimed firearms towards Black Lives Matter protestors in St. Louis in June 2020.

2020 elections and QAnon 

Wood has claimed that President Trump won the presidential election with 70% of the vote, and that a secret cabal of international communists, Chinese intelligence, and Republican officials had conspired to steal the election from Trump. While litigating on Trump's behalf, he falsely asserted to the media and in court that more votes were cast in Michigan during the 2020 presidential election than the entire population of eligible voters in the state, a conclusion he drew from a mistaken comparison of the Michigan vote total with Minnesota population data.

Wood has circulated multiple videos alleging that Cobb County, Georgia shredded evidence of voter fraud in the November 2020 general election, and his Twitter profile includes the hashtag #WWG1WGA (where we go one, we go all), a slogan associated with the far-right QAnon conspiracy theory.

Wood called for would-be Republican voters to "threaten to withhold your votes" and monetary support for Georgia's Republican candidates for the Senate, incumbents David Perdue and Kelly Loeffler, if they did not demand "investigations" into the election.

At the end of December 2020, Wood launched a series of baseless allegations on Twitter: he implied that Chief Justice John Roberts was involved in the death of Justice Antonin Scalia, suggested that Roberts was a child trafficker, declared that the deceased Jeffrey Epstein was actually alive, and that Epstein could reveal the truth about Roberts. At the start of January 2021, Wood declared his belief that Vice President Mike Pence would "face execution by firing squad" for "treason", after Pence's lawyers fought a lawsuit which was aimed at making Pence refuse to count electoral votes for Joe Biden. Wood also called for Roberts and Senate Majority Leader Mitch McConnell to be arrested for treason. Wood was criticized for these comments, and responded by insisting that he is not insane.

In early January 2021, Wood continued promoting unfounded conspiracy theories linked to QAnon, alleging that Roberts had committed child rape and child murder, and was being blackmailed for this by ten intelligence agencies of various nations. Wood said that hacker group Lizard Squad obtained the information; a former member of Lizard Squad denied this. Wood also baselessly claimed that QAnon supporter Isaac Kappy was murdered for attempting to transmit the information to then-President Trump (Kappy committed suicide in 2019).  On January 11, 2021, Delaware Superior Court Judge Craig A. Karsnitz gave Wood's social media postings in his published reasons for an order revoking Wood's right to appear before the court. Karsnitz described the allegations about Roberts as "too disgusting and outrageous to repeat," and stated that he had "no doubt" that Wood's tweets (along with "many other things") played a role in inciting the attack on the Capitol that occurred a few days before.

On January 6, 2021, before the College vote count, through a Twitter Post, Wood called for the immediate resignation of Vice President Mike Pence, Deputy Attorney general  Rod Rosenstein and Supreme Court Justice John Roberts and asserted that charges should be brought against Pence and Rosenstein. His Twitter account was permanently suspended after the January 2021 storming of the Capitol by a pro-Trump mob. After the attack on the Capitol, Wood falsely claimed that members of the pro-Trump mob were antifa activists in disguise and that Vice President Mike Pence was a "child molester". Wood subsequently called for the execution of Pence on Parler, writing, "Get the firing squads ready. Pence goes FIRST." Parler removed several of Wood's posts due to violations of their community guidelines, including the one calling for Pence's execution.

In May 2021, Wood (alongside Sidney Powell and Michael Flynn) was a keynote speaker at a QAnon conference in Dallas, Texas.

Georgia
On November 13, 2020, after Joe Biden defeated Trump in the presidential election in Georgia, Wood filed a lawsuit in the federal district court in Atlanta, naming himself as plaintiff. Wood claimed that Georgia's procedures for handling absentee ballots had been unconstitutional since March 2020 and sought to block certification of the state's election results. Wood later also claimed that Georgia's recounting of votes was flawed.

Wood's lawsuit failed on November 19, 2020, when U.S. District Judge Steven Grimberg, who was appointed by Trump, found "no basis in fact or in law" to stop Georgia's certification of its election results at such a late stage, as this would "breed confusion and potential disenfranchisement". The judge ruled that Wood had no legal standing to bring the lawsuit, and had brought the case too late. Wood failed to show that he had been harmed, while his proposal would "harm the public in countless ways".

A three-judge panel on the U.S. Court of Appeals for the Eleventh Circuit unanimously affirmed the district court's dismissal of the suit on December 5, 2020. The court found that Wood had failed "to allege a particularized injury" and his request to delay certification was in any case moot because Georgia had by then already certified its election results.

On December 18, 2020, Wood filed another lawsuit in the U.S. District Court for the Northern District of Georgia. Wood sought an emergency injunction to halt the Senatorial runoff election for the two United States Senate seats from Georgia. The complaint contained a remarkable typographical error in that it was verified by Wood "under plenty of perjury" rather than "under penalty of perjury". U.S. District Judge Timothy Batten denied Wood's request for a temporary restraining order on December 28, 2020, stating that Wood lacked standing to file the lawsuit, that his claims of potential voter fraud were "too speculative," and that overall the lawsuit had "no basis in fact or law."

Michigan
On December 7, 2020, Wood lost the federal lawsuits he litigated with Sidney Powell in Michigan, where they had argued to overturn Joe Biden's victory in the state and award the victory to President Donald Trump. In denying their request for relief, U.S. District Judge Linda V. Parker stated that the plaintiffs had only offered "theories, conjecture, and speculation" of potential vote switching, that the "ship has sailed" for most of the relief requested, and that much of what was sought "is beyond the power of any court". Parker also suggested that Wood and Powell's motive for filing the case was not to win, but to shake "people's faith in the democratic process and their trust in our government" and that granting their requests would "greatly harm the public interest."

In January 2021, the City of Detroit filed a motion to call for sanctions against Wood, Powell, and other lawyers who filed the unsuccessful case challenging Michigan's election results. In a July 2021 court hearing, Wood argued that he could not be sanctioned.  He said his name was "placed on" the complaint, but he "had no involvement whatsoever with it". Wood said that he had "generally indicated" to Powell that if she required a "trial lawyer", he would "certainly be willing or available to help her", while Powell said she believed that she added Wood to the case with him knowing about it, but also said that may have been a "misunderstanding". Although the court prohibited "broadcasting of judicial proceedings", Wood posted a two-minute video of the court hearing on the Telegram messaging application, later deleting it.

On August 25, 2021, the Court ruled that Wood, Powell, and the other plaintiff's counsel "filed this lawsuit in bad faith and for an improper purpose"; ordered them to pay attorney's fees of some of the defendants; and referred them to their respective state bars for disciplinary action. The court determined that the pro-Trump attorneys had participated in "a historic and profound abuse of the judicial process," namely filing a baseless, frivolous lawsuit in order to undermine public confidence in the democratic process.

Delaware
Based on his actions in election-related cases, Judge Karsnitz ordered Wood to show cause why his right to appear pro hac vice in a Delaware Superior Court defamation case where he was representing Carter Page; Wood's right to appear was revoked on January 11, 2021.  In explaining his decision, Judge Karsnitz wrote that Wood's actions in the Georgia and Wisconsin election-related lawsuits "exhibited a toxic stew of mendacity, prevarication, and surprising incompetence."  Karsnitz agreed with Judge Batten that the Georgia lawsuit was a "textbook [example of] frivolous litigation," and stated that the initial pleadings in the Wisconsin case "would not survive a law school civil procedure class." Judge Karsnitz concluded that he was satisfied that "it would be inappropriate and inadvisable to continue Mr. Wood's permission to practice before this court."  In issuing the order, Karsnitz was highly critical of Wood's social media postings, though he stated that his decision was based on Wood's litigation conduct.

Law firm break-up 
In August 2020, Wood was sued by three of his former law firm colleagues, in a lawsuit which alleged that Wood owed them money because he breached a contract regarding a settlement between them when the trio tried to leave his law firm. The lawsuit also alleged that Wood had fraudulently induced them with "abusive" communications, including that "God Almighty" was directing him. Wood responded that the lawsuit was a "shakedown" for money, claiming that the communications were "irrelevant" and from "a difficult time in my personal life arising primarily from my family's reaction to my faith in Jesus Christ."

Bar investigation 

In 2021, the Georgia State Bar commenced an investigation to determine whether Wood violated the state's rules of professional conduct in his election-related litigation. As part of that investigation the state bar sought a mental health examination of Wood, which Wood unsuccessfully attempted to block. Wood was later, separately referred to the Georgia State Bar for possible discipline over the Michigan election litigation in which he participated, a lawsuit the Michigan judge found was filed "in bad faith and for improper purpose."

Views 
Wood is a 9/11 truther, claiming "no planes" hit the World Trade Center and Pentagon on September 11, 2001 and that the planes visible in the footage are "Computer-generated imagery" (CGI)". According to posts made on his social media, he believes the Earth is flat, writing "Is the Earth flat or is it a spinning ball??? The answer is found in the Holy Bible. Do the research. Connect the dots. Draw your own conclusion".

Personal life
Wood lived in Atlanta, Georgia from 1955 until 2020. In April 2020 he purchased property in South Carolina, and moved there later that year. He formally changed his legal residency to South Carolina in February 2021. In February 2021, Georgia Secretary of State Brad Raffensperger's office announced that it was investigating the possibility that Wood had committed voter fraud due to questions over whether Wood had been a legal resident of the state when he cast his vote in the 2020 elections in Georgia. According to Georgia law, if someone moves to another state with the intention of establishing residence, they are no longer a resident of Georgia.

Wood has four children, two of whom are attorneys. According to documents submitted in court, Wood is estranged from his adult children and his grandchild.

In 2016, Wood and Mercer University announced a one million dollar fund set up by Wood at his alma mater to be called the "L. Lin Wood Fund for the Enhancement of Mercer Law School".

References

External links

 
 

1952 births
20th-century American lawyers
21st-century American lawyers
American conspiracy theorists
Georgia (U.S. state) lawyers
Killing of JonBenét Ramsey
Living people
Mercer University alumni
People from Macon, Georgia
People from Raleigh, North Carolina
South Carolina lawyers
QAnon
Flat Earth proponents